Hoje or variants may refer to:

Geography
 Höje River (Swedish: Höje å), a river in Scania in southern Sweden
 Høje Gladsaxe (Gladsaxe Heights), a housing project in Copenhagen, Denmark
 Høje Sandbjerg, part of Søllerød Naturpark in Rudersdal Municipality, Copenhagen, Denmark
 Høje-Taastrup Municipality, eastern Denmark
 Høje Taastrup station, a railway station in Høje-Taastrup municipality, Denmark
 Lindholm Høje (Lindholm Hills), a Viking burial site, Aalborg

Film and TV
Hoje (film), a 2011 Brazilian film
Jornal Hoje, a news program aired by the Brazilian television broadcaster Rede Globo

Music
Hoje (Ludmilla album), 2014 
Hoje (Os Paralamas do Sucesso album)
Hoje, am album by Gal Costa
Hoje É o Primeiro Dia do Resto da Sua Vida, by Rita Lee